Bilu may refer to:

People
 Bilú (footballer, 1900-1965), Virgílio Pinto de Oliveira, Brazilian football manager and former centre-back
 Asher Bilu (born 1936), Australian artist
 Bilú (footballer, born 1974), Luciano Lopes de Souza, Brazilian football manager and former defensive midfielder
 Rafael Bilú, Brazilian football player
 Vidi Bilu (born 1959), Israeli film director
 Yoram Bilu, Israeli professor of anthropology

Places
 Bilu, Baneh, Iran
 Bilu, Marivan, Iran
 Bilu Island, Myanmar
 Kfar Bilu, Israel
 Talmei Bilu, Israel

Other
 Bilu (movement), Jewish movement